Villainy & Virtue is the second full-length album released by Chicago, Illinois-based metalcore band Dead to Fall.

Track listing

Members
Jonathan Hunt - Vocals 
Matthew Matera - Rhythm Guitar
Logan Kelly - Lead Guitar
Justin Jakimiak - Bass guitar
Evan Kaplan - Drums

Reception
Punknews.org  link
Lambgoat  link|

Miscellanea
This album marked the introduction of Paul A. Romano as the band's artwork designer.

Dead to Fall albums
2004 albums
Victory Records albums